The Albert Lasker Award for Basic Medical Research is one of the prizes awarded by the Lasker Foundation for a fundamental discovery that opens up a new area of biomedical science. The award frequently precedes a Nobel Prize in Medicine; almost 50% of the winners have gone on to win one.

List of Albert Lasker Award for Basic Medical Research recipients 

{|
| Valign="top"|

See also

 List of biomedical science awards

Notes

Lasker
Lasker Award